Lucy Seki (27 March 193923 June 2017) was a Brazilian linguist specializing in indigenous languages of the Americas.  She authored a grammar of the Kamayurá language.

Biography
Lucy Seki had a Master's and Ph.D. in linguistics from the Patrice Lumumba University in Moscow.  She was also awarded a Bachelor in history by the Federal University of Minas Gerais, and did post-doctorate studies at the University of Texas at Austin.  She was a full professor at the State University of Campinas (UNICAMP), Brazil.  In 2010, she was elected an honorary member of the Linguistic Society of America for her outstanding contribution to the field.

Publications

Books
 Gramática do Kamaiurá, Língua Tupi-Guarani do Alto Xingu. 482 pages + 17 color photo album Editora UNICAMP and São Paulo State Official Press (2000, in Portuguese). .

Papers
 Kamaiurá (Tupi-Guarani) as an active-stative language. In D. L. Payne (ed.), Amazonian linguistics: Studies in Lowland South American languages,  University of Texas Press (1990).

References

External links
 Coleção Lucy Seki: papers by Lucy Seki at the Curt Nimuendaju Digital Library
 Lucy Seki's profile at Etnolinguistica.Org's Directory of South Americanists

1939 births
2017 deaths
Linguists from Brazil
People from Belo Horizonte
Peoples' Friendship University of Russia alumni
Academic staff of the State University of Campinas